Group D of the 2000 Fed Cup Europe/Africa Zone Group II was one of four pools in the Europe/Africa zone of the 2000 Fed Cup. Five teams competed in a round robin competition, with the top team advancing to Group I for 2001.

Estonia vs. Moldova

Portugal vs. Lesotho

Algeria vs. Madagascar

Estonia vs. Lesotho

Moldova vs. Algeria

Portugal vs. Madagascar

Estonia vs. Algeria

Moldova vs. Portugal

Madagascar vs. Lesotho

Estonia vs. Madagascar

Moldova vs. Lesotho

Portugal vs. Algeria

Estonia vs. Portugal

Moldova vs. Madagascar

Algeria vs. Lesotho

  placed first in this group and thus advanced to Group I for 2001, where they placed third in their pool of four.

See also
Fed Cup structure

References

External links
 Fed Cup website

2000 Fed Cup Europe/Africa Zone